St Lawrence Parish Church is an active Anglican church in York, England. It is situated in Lawrence Street, just outside Walmgate Bar.

History 

It is dedicated to St Lawrence, possibly in deliberate reference to the Basilica of Saint Lawrence outside the Walls, in Rome. The tower of the old church building remains in the churchyard – the doorway and lower half date to the 12th-century. This tower is now cared for by the Churches Conservation Trust. The oldest gravestones in the churchyard lie on the site of the demolished nave and chancel, and include tombs of the Heskeths and Yarburghs of Heslington Hall.

The parish was united with that of St Nicholas after that church was destroyed in the Siege of York. St Lawrence was also severely damaged, but was rebuilt at the Restoration, and silver and furniture from c.1669 remain. Sir John Vanbrugh married Henrietta Maria Yarburgh here on a snowy day in 1719. The churchyard contains the 1830 Rigg Memorial – built by public subscription for six children who died in a boating accident, with an epitaph by James Montgomery – and the 1820 'medicine pot' memorial to Dr Oswald Allen (who ran the York Dispensary charity) and his wife. These monuments, together with the tower, are Grade I listed.

The old church was demolished in 1881–83 in order to build a much larger building, the second-largest religious building in York after York Minster. It is the leading work of J. B. Hall of Canterbury. The spire was added in 1891–3, with an illuminated clock given in memory of his parents by Alderman Robert Fawcett. The church contains the elaborate c.1400 font, moved from the old church. Much of the stained glass was produced by the Knowles family of Stonegate, including the recently restored east window. There is a very unusual and large art deco First World War memorial window depicting the Somme battlefield, the city of York, and a knight and grail cup, designed in 1929 by Joan Fulleylove. The chancel area was remodelled by Robert 'Mousey' Thompson of Kilburn as a Second World War memorial. The church has otherwise been little altered.

The tower of the old church is designated as a Grade I listed building, and as part of a scheduled monument which includes the buried remains of the medieval church and majority of its burial ground. The 19th-century church is Grade II listed.

Bells 

The church was given a set of 8 bells hung for change ringing in 1999, by the bellringers of York, to mark the millennium. They were all cast (in 1947, 1988, and 1999 respectively), and hung together, by John Taylor & Co, of Loughborough. These are rung by the St Lawrence Society of Change Ringers. Four of the bells formerly hung in Charrington's Brewery, London. The bells were all 'christened' on Easter Day of 1999 after the historic dedications of religious houses within the modern parish: (treble-tenor) St Helen, St Edward the Confessor, St Andrew, All Hallows, St Catherine, St Michael, St Nicholas, St Laurence.

St Lawrence Today 

The church has a large Community Hall, built on the former site of a line of cottages belonging to the Vicars Choral of York Minster in 1935.

The church maintains a robed choir. It currently holds three services every Sunday, using a mixture of Book of Common Prayer and Common Worship rites, and is one of only two York parish churches to still sing Evensong every Sunday.

In early 2014, the east window of the church was severely damaged in high winds. The window has since been restored.

St Lawrence in 2014 made online and print news due to wide online circulation of a video of the Trololo song being performed there as part of a University of York Brass Band Society concert.

In the last few years the parish church has seen fresh rejuvenation. In 2020 an organ which had previously been in St Michael Le Belfrey church, central York, was moved to St Lawrence's, refurbished and installed. The church hall has been fully refurbished.  In 2016 the Rigg Memorial was restored by York Civic Trust and was dedicated by the Archbishop of York on 11 March 2017. During 2016 and 2017 the church under went a major building project which included the installation of a new heating system, significant re-wiring and lighting costing in excess of £200,000.  In conjunction with the York Civic Trust the Vicar and Churchwardens are working on an extensive churchyard improvement project which will look to address parking, lighting, the footprint of the medieval church and the boundary walls.   These improvements to the church and the excellent acoustics have led to an increased use of the building for concerts.

References

External links

 Church Website
 Church Near You page
 St Lawrence Society of Change Ringers' website

Lawrence
Lawrence
York